The Church of San Tommaso Apostolo is a titular church in the Roman Catholic church for Cardinal-priests.

Church 
It was built as parish church for the parish of St. thomas, established on 1964.02.19 in the XXVIIth prefecture of southern Rome, in the papal diocese. The church was dedicated to Saint Thomas the Apostle on 2013.04.13. Its address is Via A. Mariani, in Infernetto in Rome.

It enjoyed papal visits by Pope John Paul II on 1989.12.03 and by Pope Francis on 2014.02.16.

Cardinal-protectors 
The title was established on 14 February 2015.

It has been held by the following Cardinal-priests :
 (Vietnamese) Peter Nguyễn Văn Nhơn (2015.02.14 – ...), while Metropolitan Archbishop of Roman Catholic Archdiocese of Hanoi (2010.05.13 – 2018.11.17); previously Coadjutor Bishop of Đà Lat (Vietnam) (1991.10.11 – 1994.03.23) succeeding as Bishop of Đà Lat (1994.03.23 – 2010.04.22), President of Episcopal Conference of Vietnam (2007 – 2013), Coadjutor Archbishop of Hà Nôi (2010.04.22 – 2010.05.13).

References

External links
 GCatholic the cardinal title 
 GCatholic.org: Chiesa di San Tommaso Apostolo ad Infernetto 
 Catholic-Hierarchy.org: Cardinal Nguyen Van Nhon 
 Catholic-Hierarchy.org: San Tommaso Apostolo 
 Parochial website, in Italian

Titular churches
20th-century Roman Catholic church buildings in Italy